Harnaaz Kaur Sandhu (born 3 March 2000) is an Indian model, actress, and beauty pageant titleholder who was crowned Miss Universe 2021. Sandhu had been previously crowned Miss Diva Universe 2021, and is the third entrant from India to win Miss Universe. Sandhu was also crowned Femina Miss India Punjab in 2019, and placed as a semifinalist at Femina Miss India 2019.

Early life and education
Sandhu was born in the village of Kohali in Gurdaspur district, Punjab, to parents Pritampal Singh Sandhu and Rabinder Kaur Sandhu. Her father is a realtor and her mother is a gynecologist. She also has one sibling. Sandhu was raised in a Punjabi Jat Sikh family.

In 2006, the family moved to England, before returning to India two years later and settling in Chandigarh, where Sandhu grew up. She attended Shivalik Public School and the Post Graduate Government College for Girls, both in Chandigarh. Prior to becoming Miss Universe, Sandhu was pursuing a master's degree in public administration. In addition to her native language Punjabi, Sandhu is also fluent in Hindi and English.

Pageantry
Sandhu began competing in pageantry as a teenager, winning titles such as Miss Chandigarh 2017 and Miss Max Emerging Star India 2018. She participated in Miss Diva 2018 edition and was Chandigarh finalist. At first, Sandhu did not tell her father when she registered for her first pageant, and only informed him of her participation after she won; despite this, he was accepting of her decision to pursue pageantry.

After winning the title of Femina Miss India Punjab 2019, Sandhu competed in Femina Miss India, where she was placed in the Top 12, with the winner going to Miss World.

Miss Diva 2021

On 16 August 2021, Sandhu was shortlisted as one of the Top 50 semifinalists of Miss Diva 2021. Later on 23 August, she was confirmed as one of the Top 20 finalists that would compete in the televised Miss Diva competition. During the preliminary competition held on 22 September, Sandhu won the Miss Beautiful Skin award and became a finalist for Miss Beach Body, Miss Beautiful Smile, Miss Photogenic, and Miss Talented.

In the Miss Diva 2021 contest's opening statement round during the grand finale, Sandhu, as one of the top 10 semifinalists, said:

 
She was selected in the succeeding round of the competition. During the final question and answer round, the top 5 contestants were each given different topics to speak about, which the contestants themselves picked through the draw. Sandhu had selected "Global Warming and Climate Change", to which she said:
 

At the end of the event, Sandhu was crowned as the winner by the outgoing titleholder Adline Castelino. Thus, she acquired the right to represent India at the 70th edition of the Miss Universe pageant.

Miss Universe 2021

Sandhu represented India in the Miss Universe 2021 competition on 13 December 2021 in Eilat, Israel, beating 79 other contestants. 
In the national costume round, Sandhu wore a pink royal lehenga with matching pink umbrella adorned with mirrors.

On the final night, she was announced as one of the Top 16. In the swimsuit round she wore a maroon monokini paired with a leopard printed cape, advancing to the Top 10. In the Top 10, evening gown round Sandhu wore a champagne silver colored gown designed by Saisha Shinde. She then advanced to Top 5.

During the top 5 question and answer round, Sandhu had to pick a one of the selection panel's members, who would then asked them a question. Sandhu picked Rena Sofer, who asked her "many people think climate change is a hoax, what would you do to convince them to take it seriously?" She answered:

{{blockquote|text=Honestly, my heart breaks to see how nature is going through a lot of problems and it is all due to our irresponsible behavior and I totally feel that this is the time to take actions and talk less because our each action could either kill or save nature. Prevent and protect is better than repent and repair, this is what I am trying to convince you guys today. Thank you. 

Advancing to the Top 3, in the final question and answer portion, the three contestants were asked the same question by the host Steve Harvey: "What advice would you give to young women watching on how to deal with the pressures they face today?" Sandhu replied:

{{blockquote|text="Well I think the biggest pressure the youth of today is facing is to believe in themselves. To know that you are unique and that is what makes you beautiful, stop comparing yourselves with others and let's talk about more important things that's happening worldwide. I think this is what you need to understand, come out, speak for yourself because you are the leader of your life, you are the voice of your own. I believed in myself and that's why I am standing here today. Thank you."

She became the third Indian winner following Sushmita Sen in 1994, and Lara Dutta in 2000. Sandhu was announced Miss Universe 2021 by host Steve Harvey and crowned by the outgoing titleholder Andrea Meza of Mexico.

As Miss Universe, Sandhu traveled to Israel, various cities within the United States, the Philippines, Indonesia, Vietnam, and Thailand.

On January 14, 2023, Sandhu crowned R'Bonney Gabriel of the United States as her successor at the 71st Miss Universe pageant at the New Orleans Morial Convention Center, New Orleans, Louisiana, United States.

Filmography

Films

Television

Music videos

Awards

References

External links

2000 births
Female models from Chandigarh
Indian beauty pageant winners
Indian female models
Living people
Miss Universe 2021 contestants
Miss Universe winners
People from Gurdaspur district
Indian Sikhs